Navin Jaiswal is a member of Legislative Assembly of Jharkhand state, India. He represents Hatia Assembly seat as its MLA. He was member of All Jharkhand Students Union then shifting to Jharkhand Vikas Morcha (Prajatantrik) in November 2014.

In February 2015, Jaiswal was one of the six MLAs who joined the BJP, a day after petitioning the Speaker to allow them to sit alongside the ruling Bharatiya Janata Party-led coalition members in the state Assembly.

References

Living people
Year of birth missing (living people)
Jharkhand MLAs 2009–2014
Jharkhand MLAs 2014–2019
Jharkhand MLAs 2019–2024
Bharatiya Janata Party politicians from Jharkhand
All Jharkhand Students Union politicians
Jharkhand Vikas Morcha (Prajatantrik) politicians
Politicians from Ranchi